ʿAli Shīr al-Ḥanafī al-Bangālī (d. 1570s), or simply Ali Sher Bengali, was a 16th-century Bengali author, teacher and Sufi pir of the Shattari order. He was one of the three khalifahs (successors) of Muhammad Ghawth Shattari.

Background
Ali Sher was born into a Bengali Muslim family in the town of Sylhet in the Bengal Sultanate. His family traced their origins to Nurul Huda Abul Karamat, a 14th-century Middle Eastern migrant who accompanied Shah Jalal in the Conquest of Sylhet and was later appointed as the second Wazir of Arsah Srihat. He was a Hanafi.

Life
In his youth, Sher began travelling across the subcontinent for further Islamic studies. When he reached Awadh, it is said that he saw Muhammad Ghawth Shattari in a dream. Sher then travelled to Delhi where he met with Ghawth and became his murid (student). He was one of the two prominent Bengali students of Shattari, the other being Shah Manjhan of Lakhnauti. Shaikh Yusuf Bengali was a student of Ali Sher's contemporary Wajihuddin Alvi.

After studying and serving under Muhammad Ghawth Shattari for a while, Ali Sher Bengali was then ordered to visit Ahmedabad in Gujarat and settle down at the Imad-ul-Mulk Rumi Masjid to become a teacher himself as a khalifa of Shattari. Among his notable students was Abdullah ibn Mahmud al-Husayni al-Bukhari. Ali Sher was a critic of the Sur emperors who were then ruling the region.

In 1571, Ali Sher Bengali wrote a book called A commentary on the excursion of the souls, which contained the earliest recorded written biography of Shah Jalal in its preface. Among his other books are Sharḥ Jām-i Jahān Nāma and Sharḥ Sawāniḥ. The works were compiled under the instruction of Muhammad Ghawth Shattari.

Spiritual genealogy
Spiritual genealogy of Ali Sher Bengali is as follows:
 Prophet Muhammad
 Ali ibn Abi Talib
 Husayn ibn Ali
 Zayn al-Abidin
 Muhammad al-Baqir
 Ja'far al-Sadiq
 Isma'il ibn Ja'far
 Abu Bakr al Ajli
 Taqi ad-Din Najib
 Ahmad as-Siddiq
 Sima al-Wasil
 Farid ad-Din Attar
 Khatir ad-Din Bayazid
 Muhammad Ghawth Gwaliori
 Ali Sher Bengali

Death
According to the guardians of his shrine, Ali Sher Bengali died on 23 Safar 970 AH (22 October 1562). He was buried near the Shahi Masjid in the neighbourhood of Paldi in Ahmedabad, Gujarat. His urs is celebrated on 23 Safar by devotees every year. However, Ali Sher Bengali wrote Sharh Nuzhat al-Arwah, which was in 977 AH (1571 CE) and according to Abd al-Hayy al-Lucknawi and the Gulzar-i-Abrar, he died a few years after 970 AH.

References

Further reading
 

16th-century Bengalis
Bengali Muslim scholars of Islam
16th-century Muslim theologians
People from Sylhet
People from Ahmedabad
1570s deaths